"Tal Vez" is a 2003 song by Ricky Martin.

Tal Vez may also refer to:
 "Tal Vez" (Paulo Londra song), 2019
Tal Vez, a 2006 album by Los Primos de Durango
 "Tal Vez", a 1993 song by Marta Sánchez from the album Mujer
 "Tal Vez", a 2006 song by Kudai from the album Sobrevive
 "Tal Vez", a 2008 song by Magnate & Valentino from Don Omar's album El Pentágono: The Return
 "Talvez", a 2020 song by Caetano Veloso

See also
"Tal Vez, Quizá", 2001 song by Paulina Rubio